"Just the Way You Are" is the debut solo single by American singer-songwriter Bruno Mars. It is the lead single from his debut studio album, Doo-Wops & Hooligans (2010). The song was written by Mars, Philip Lawrence, Ari Levine, Khalil Walton and Needlz and produced by the former three, under their alias, the Smeezingtons along with Needlz. It was released in the United States to contemporary hit radio on August 10, 2010. The track was released in the United Kingdom on September 19, 2010, as "Just the Way You Are (Amazing)". The song's lyrics compliment a woman's beauty.

The debut single received mixed reviews from music critics, who praised the Smeezingtons' production but dubbed its lyrics as sappy and corny. It won Best Male Pop Vocal Performance at the 53rd Annual Grammy Awards. The song peaked at number one on the US Billboard Hot 100, Australia, Canada, New Zealand and in the United Kingdom charts and peaked in the top five in other countries. It was certified thirteen times platinum by the Recording Industry Association of America (RIAA), seven times platinum by the Australian Recording Industry Association (ARIA) and diamond by Music Canada (MC). "Just the Way You Are" was the best-selling digital single of 2011, selling more than 12.5 million copies, thus joining an elite group of best-selling singles worldwide.

The music video, directed by Ethan Lader, was released on September 8, 2010, and features Peruvian born Australian actress Nathalie Kelley. Mars performed "Just The Way You Are" at Saturday Night Live and at The Ellen DeGeneres Show. He has sung "Just the Way You Are" on all his tours since 2010, sometimes as an encore, and included it during his performance at the Super Bowl XLVIII halftime show. The song has been covered by various recording artists and it inspired Meghan Trainor's debut single "All About That Bass" (2014).

Writing and production
Bruno Mars said of the song, "It took me months to come up with 'Just the Way You Are'... I wasn't thinking of anything deep or poetic. I was telling a story. Get ready to fall in love!" It was inspired by Eric Clapton's "Wonderful Tonight" (1977) and Sinéad O'Connor's "Nothing Compares 2 U" (1990). Mars explained, "I'm a big fan of songs like Joe Cocker's 'You Are So Beautiful' and Clapton's 'Wonderful Tonight' – songs that go straight to the point. You know, there's no mind-boggling lyrics or twists in the story – they just come directly from the heart. And to me 'Just The Way You Are' is one of those songs. There's nothing mind-blowing about it. I'm just telling a woman she looks beautiful the way she IS – and, let's be honest, what woman doesn't wanna hear those lyrics?!" 

Mars's A&R, Aaron Bay-Schuck, was responsible for finding the original idea from American record producers and songwriters Khalil Walton and Needlz. Mars originally sang the hook that Khalil and Needlz wrote for a feature on a Lupe Fiasco record. Needlz allowed Mars to use the idea for his album. This was all facilitated by Bay-Shuck, who told HitQuarters that as soon as "Just the Way You Are" was finished they knew they had the first single, saying:
"It had a massive chorus, an instantly memorable melody and lyric, and was a natural transition from the B.o.B and Travie McCoy songs ... [Also] it didn't sound like anything else on the radio. It had everything we could want in a first single for Bruno."

Ari Levine explained: "Needlz had a track with a melody idea by Khalil Walton that was presented to us by one of the A&R guys. Bruno and Phil came up with the chorus, and then Needlz sent us the files and we replaced a bunch of sounds with our sounds and I programmed drums in the MPC, and we wrote the rest of the song. I never met Needlz or Walton".
The song was offered to Lupe Fiasco and CeeLo Green, but at that point, Mars decided to keep it.

"Just the Way You Are" was written by Mars, Philip Lawrence, Levine, Walton, and Needlz, while production was handled by the Smeezingtons along with Needlz. Levine and Mars played all the instruments on the track, with the former engineering the song at Levcon Studios in California. The track was mixed at Larrabee Sound Studios in Los Angeles by Manny Marroquin, while Christian Plata and Erik Madrid served as mixing assistants. It was mastered by Stephen Marcussen at Marcussen Mastering in Hollywood, California.

Release
"Just The Way You Are" was released as the lead single from Doo-Wops & Hooligans. Elektra Records serviced the song to download in the United States on July 20, 2010. It was released in the United States to contemporary hit radio on August 10, 2010 ,by Elektra and Atlantic Records. On September 27, 2010, the song was released for digital download, under the name, Just the Way You Are (Amazing). On November 2, seven remixes were released as a purchasable download in US. It was released as a CD single in Germany, Austria, and Switzerland, on November 12. It contains the album version of the song and the remix by Skrillex Batboi. The track was released on September 27, 2010, in the United Kingdom via digital download. On November 2, 2010, an EP that includes several remixes was released in various countries. Skrillex, Martin Danielle and the Manufactured Superstars were among the names to remix the original version into electronic dance music versions. A deluxe edition which includes the official remix with rapper Lupe Fiasco and the music video was released on November 25, 2010. The official remix was also released on the deluxe edition of Doo-Wops & Hooligans (2010).

Composition and lyrical interpretation

"Just The Way You Are" is a pop, R&B and soft rock ballad. Its instrumentation features piano and a "hip-hop breakbeat". Tim Byron of The Vine said "the steeply rising melody at the start of the chorus introduces a little tension before defusing it with the catchy tag of the chorus, which is simple and effective as a hook". Billboard said that Mars "takes his dreamy soprano to the next level" on the track. The song is in the key of F major and has a sequence of F–Dm–B–F. Mars's vocal range spans from F3 to C5.

Billboard called "Just The Way You Are" "a feel-good jam". Leah Greenblatt of Entertainment Weekly labeled the song "sweetly smitten ballad". Brad Wete, writing for the same publication, described the track as "an endearing mid-tempo". Wete also said its "vibe" resembles the "collaboration with B.o.B–just not as groovy". Nick Levine from Digital Spy describe it as a "huge-hearted urbany piano ballad", comparing its sound to "Empire State of Mind" (2009)." The song has been compared to a "U2 production" by Jon Caramanica of The New York Times and by Andy Gill adding that he felt a "groove through R&B territory". Tim Sendra of AllMusic called the debut single "lushly romantic". Scott Kara for the New Zealand Herald dubbed the song as a "ballad boogie".

Lyrically, the song is about Mars professing "his love for a beautiful girl who occupies his dreams", on the verses "When you smile, the whole world stops and stares for a while/ 'Cause girl you're amazing, just the way you are". Billboard concludes, "Mars pens lyrics that aim to make female listeners feel nothing short of perfect in their own skin". Byron said the lyrics are "effective – the repeated lines at the start of the verses are catchy". Consequence of Sounds Alex Young described the song "Mars sticks to the song's name and insists that he wouldn't want to change anything about his particular gal. You believe him, too. With an undeniably catchy chorus". Lester said the lyrics are "about a girl Mars could 'kiss all day'."

Reception and accolades
The song received mixed reviews from music critics. Digital Spys Nick Levine gave it four out of five stars and described it as a "huge-hearted urbany piano ballad [...] with a similar, if not quite as undeniable, instant classic feel to 'Empire State of Mind' by Jay-Z featuring Alicia Keys". Billboard wrote: "With its steady, danceable pulse and singalong chorus, Mars has created a feel-good jam that should establish him as a solo contender in his own right." Alex Young from Consequence of Sound praised the track's chorus for being "undeniably catchy" and didn't find surprising for the single to be a "radio staple". AllMusic's Tim Sendra gave the single a mixed review saying, "it's not very deep and it's not poetry, but sweetly played and sung". He believes it, "will melt hearts from tweens to old folk". Tony Clayton-Lea of The Irish Times dubbed the single "a slice of wide-eyed pop that automatically coaxes a smile."

On the other hand, Tim Byron of The Vine compared "Just the Way You Are" to Billy Joel's 1977 hit single of the same name, saying the latter "is a little more ambiguous...more aware of the ups and downs that characterize relationships". Jamie Milton of musicOMH explained that "Just the Way You Are" can be mistaken for a pop song due to its tempo. However, it is one of the most "sappiest ballads" to be heard in some time. Nima Baniamer from Contactmusic.com felt the single didn't make Mars stand out from other R&B artists. Baniamer added, "The song never builds to any climax and it simply falls a bit flat, coming across quite corny and cheesy." The Guardian Paul Lester dubbed Mars's vocals as breezy on the track as a "breezy falsetto as characterless as you'd imagine."

The song was nominated for the 2010 The Record of the Year ceremony. In 2011, the song won the Grammy Award for Best Male Pop Vocal Performance. The single was nominated for several awards at 2011 Billboard Music Awards such as Top Hot 100 Song and Top Pop Song, but it ended up by winning only the category Top Radio Song. It was nominated for Choice Music: Love Song at the 2011 Teen Choice Awards. In the same year, the single was one of the winners of Most Performed Songs at ASCAP Pop Music Awards. In 2012, at the same award ceremony, it won, again, Most Performed Songs and also Song of the Year. At the RTHK International Pop Poll Awards the song won "Top 10 Gold International Gold Songs".

Commercial performance
The song reached the top of the US Billboard Hot 100 on the chart dated October 2, 2010, ending the two-week reign of Katy Perry's "Teenage Dream" (2010). The song spent a total of 48 weeks on the Billboard Hot 100, debuting on August 7, 2010 and leaving the chart on July 2, 2011. As of October 2015, the song had sold 6.7 million downloads domestically. The song was certified thirteen times platinum by the Recording Industry Association of America (RIAA). It holds the record of the longest-reigning debut format on the Adult Contemporary, having spent 20 weeks atop. The song peaked at number one on the Canadian Hot 100 and was certified diamond by Music Canada (MC).

On September 26, 2010, it became the singer's second number-one single in the United Kingdom, where it hit the number-one spot again on October 24, 2010 from sales of 116,000 copies becoming the first song ever to have left the top three before rebounding to the top spot. It sold 766,000 copies during 2010, becoming the third biggest seller of the year. On April 9, 2013 it was revealed that the song is the ninth most downloaded song of all time in the United Kingdom. On August 2, 2011 "Just The Way You Are" became the 108th million-selling single in the UK, having taken 43 weeks to reach that figure. As of September 2017, in the United Kingdom, the single had reached a total of 1,57 million combined sales (1.33 million purchases and 244,72 streaming equivalent sales), becoming the 75th biggest selling single of all-time in UK. "Just the Way You Are" is the seventeenth best-selling single based on paid-for sales of the 21st century in the United Kingdom. It was certified four times platinum by the British Phonographic Industry (BPI). On October 12, 2010, Bruno Mars got his third number one single in the Dutch Top 40, after "Nothin' On You" (2009) and "Billionaire" (2010), having spent 11 weeks at number one in Netherlands. The song also reached number one in Australia and certified seven times platinum by the Australian Recording Industry Association (ARIA). The single debuted at number 31 in New Zealand on August 2, 2010. The song was number 1 for two weeks. The single was on the chart for 32 weeks.

"Just the Way You Are" was less successful on the French Singles Chart, where it peaked at number 33 and stayed on the chart for 28 weeks. "Just The Way You Are" also peaked at number three in Switzerland, at number one in the Republic of Ireland, at number four in Belgium (Flanders), and at number 2 in Germany and Sweden. It reached number six at Denmark. "Just the Way You Are" was the best selling digital single of 2011, selling more than 12.5 million copies globally throughout that year, thus becoming one of the best-selling singles of all time. The song is also one of the UK's biggest selling singles of all-time placed at number 74 with sales around 1.17 million.

Music video

Development and synopsis

The corresponding music video was directed by Ethan Lander, shot in September 2010 in the downtown of Los Angeles and released on September 8, 2010. Cameron Duddy was able to shoot the behind-the-scenes footage in exchange for his jean jacket, which Mars used during the music video. The video features Peruvian-Australian actress Nathalie Kelley. Lander considers Bruno Mars a star. He adds "The charisma that he has, you can't teach." Finishing with "singer even manages to be suave in his mugshot, which is no small feat!" He sees the video as a collaboration, the video director came up with the vision and Mars added his vision and so on. The video is a mixture of live-action and stopped animation and through the animation, Bruno shows his girlfriend how beautiful she is. He takes a cassette tape and starts creating images out of the tape and they start to get a life of their own.

The video begins with Kelley listening to "Just the Way You Are" on her Walkman as Mars walks in. Mars stops the tape player, removes the cassette tape, and begins singing his song. As the instrumental portion of the song begins, Mars pulls the media out of the cassette tape and arranges the media into letters forming his name followed by the song title. As the song continues, he forms a picture of a drum, again on the table, using the tape media. Additional images of similar construction follow throughout the video including a portrait of Mars as well as one of Kelley blinking her eyes and smiling as Mars continues singing. Most of the images shown are animated, including a bell which Mars rings with his fingers in synchronization with the chimes near the end of the song. Lastly, Mars finishes the song while singing and playing an upright piano while Kelley watches and smiles. The video was inspired by the artwork of Erika Iris Simmons.

Reception
At the 2011 MTV Video Music Aid Japan the music video won Best Male Video. In the same year, the video won Favorite International Video at the Myx Music Awards and received three nominations at the MuchMusic Video Awards, International Video of the Year – Artist, Most Watched Video of the Year and UR Fave International Video. It received the award for Popular International Music Video at the Channel [V] Thailand Music Video Awards. As of March 2021, the music video has received over 1.5 billion views on YouTube.

Live performances
Bruno Mars performed the song at the Bowery Ballroom in New York City on August 25, 2010, with him and his four-piece band dressed in blue tuxedos and black skinny ties. John Macdonald for Spin said "Despite a couple pitch problems here and there, Mars proved to be nearly as good a performer as he is a songwriter". Mars performed the song on Saturday Night Live on October 9, 2010. The song was performed at The Ellen DeGeneres Show, on October 14, 2010. A soulful arrangement of the song was sung for a Billboard Tastemakers video session, on October 22, 2010. An acoustic version of the song was performed at Grammy Nominations concert in 2010 for the 53rd Grammy Awards. Mars also played the song live at the BBC Radio 1Xtra Live Lounge and at the NBA All-Star Tip Off Pre-Show in January and February 2011, respectively. The song was also performed on NBC's Today Show on June 24, 2011. A live performance was also done on the French X Factor during the finale of the second season. Carolina Frost for the Huffington Post said that Mars at the 2012 Brit Awards "took his poptastic song Just the Way You Are, and gave it a fresh jazzy arrangement." Others praised Mars's vocality and confidence with his soulful rendition.

It was the twelfth song of his debut world tour, The Doo-Wops & Hooligans Tour (2010–12), and was often sung as an encore on the Hooligans in Wondaland Tour (2011). It was part of the setlist of his second world tour, The Moonshine Jungle Tour (2013–14) and was also sang on his debut concert residency, Bruno Mars at The Chelsea, Las Vegas (2013–15). "Just the Way You Are" was performed as the last song in his set list for his performance at Super Bowl XLVIII halftime show as a Tribute to the United States Armed Forces. In 2017, the singer participated in the "Somos Una Voz" relief initiative concert by singing a Spanish version of "Just the Way You Are". On his third tour, the 24K Magic World Tour (2017–18), the track was the fourteenth or fifteenth track of the setlist.

Cover versions and usage on other media
"Just the Way You Are" has been covered several times. It was first covered by Nathan Sykes from The Wanted, The Saturdays at BBC Radio 1's Live Lounge on October 29, 2010. San Diego band Pierce the Veil covered the track for the compilation album Punk Goes Pop 4, which was released on November 21, 2011. It was performed by Cory Monteith on "Furt", an episode of the American TV show Glee which aired on November 23, 2010. The show's cover version achieved moderate success by peaking at number 24 in Canada. It reached number 40 in the United States, 47 in Australia and number 48 in Ireland.

Daniel Evans, a finalist on The X Factor (UK), included his version of the song on his album Wicked Game, released on December 2, 2013. The album contains covers from various artists. Matt Cardle, the winner of the seventh series of British TV talent contest The X Factor, performed "Just the Way You Are" in week 2 of the live shows and later recorded his own version of the song, which was included in the CD single release of his debut single "When We Collide" (2010).

In 2012, Dominican musician Karlos Rosé covered the song in bachata as his debut single which peaked at number 31 on the Billboard Hot Latin Songs chart. The music video for his cover was filmed in New York City and directed by Robert Kruz. The original version is featured in the movie Pitch Perfect (2012). American singer Johnny Mathis covered the song in his album, Johnny Mathis Sings the Great New American Songbook (2017). In 2017, Mars participated in the "Somos Una Voz" relief initiative, created by Jennifer Lopez and Marc Anthony, in order to help survivors of Hurricane Maria in Puerto Rico and Mexico's 7.1 earthquake. To do so, he performed "Just the Way You Are" in Spanish for the first time. Dana International performed the song during the interval of the first semi-final of the Eurovision Song Contest 2019 in Tel Aviv. In 2020, British singer Jamie Miller covered "Just the Way You Are" as part of the tenth anniversary of Mars's debut album.

Track listing

Personnel
Credits adapted from the liner notes of Doo-Wops & Hooligans.

 Bruno Mars – lead vocals, songwriting, instrumentation
 Philip Lawrence – songwriting
 Ari Levine – songwriting, instrumentation, engineer
 The Smeezingtons – production 
 Needlz – production, songwriting

 Khalil Walton – songwriting
 Manny Marroquin – mixing
 Christian Plata – mixing assistant
 Erik Madrid – mixing assistant
 Stephen Marcussen - mastering

Charts

Weekly charts

Year-end charts

Decade-end charts

All-time charts

Certifications

Release history

See also

List of Adult Top 40 number-one songs of the 2010s
List of best-selling singles
List of best-selling singles in Australia
List of best-selling singles in the United States
List of Dutch Top 40 number-one singles of 2010
List of Hot 100 number-one singles of 2010 (Canada)
List of Hot 100 number-one singles of 2010 (U.S.)
List of Mainstream Top 40 number-one hits of 2010 (U.S.)
List of number-one adult contemporary singles of 2011 (U.S.)
List of number-one Billboard Tropical Songs of 2012
List of number-one hits of 2010 (Austria)
List of number-one singles from the 2010s (New Zealand)
List of number-one singles from the 2010s (UK)
List of number-one singles of 2010 (Australia)
List of number-one singles of 2010 (Ireland)

References

2010 songs
Bruno Mars songs
2010s ballads
Number-one singles in Australia
Canadian Hot 100 number-one singles
Dutch Top 40 number-one singles
Irish Singles Chart number-one singles
Number-one singles in Israel
Number-one singles in New Zealand
Number-one singles in Scotland
UK Singles Chart number-one singles
Billboard Hot 100 number-one singles
Record Report Pop Rock General number-one singles
Grammy Award for Best Male Pop Vocal Performance
Songs written by Bruno Mars
Songs written by Ari Levine
Songs written by Philip Lawrence (songwriter)
Song recordings produced by the Smeezingtons
Pop ballads
Bachata songs
Atlantic Records singles
Elektra Records singles
Pierce the Veil songs
Song recordings produced by Needlz
Songs written by Needlz
2010 debut singles
Animated music videos
Contemporary R&B ballads
Rock ballads
American soft rock songs
2010 singles